Huitzilopochco (sometimes called Churubusco, and other variants) was a small pre-Columbian Nahua altepetl (city-state) in the Valley of Mexico. Huitzilopochco was one of the Nauhtecuhtli ("Four Lords"), along with Culhuacan, Itztapalapan and Mexicatzinco. The name Huitzilopochco means "place of Huitzilopochtli (a god)" in Nahuatl. The inhabitants of Huitzilopochco were known as Huitzilopochca.

1520s disestablishments in North America
Altepetl
States and territories established in the 15th century
15th-century establishments in North America